Linycus is a genus of parasitoid wasps belonging to the family Ichneumonidae.

The species of this genus are found in Europe and Northern America.

Species:
 Linycus algericus (Habermehl, 1917) 
 Linycus annulicornis (Cameron, 1904)

References

Ichneumonidae
Ichneumonidae genera